Baengmagoji station is a railway station on the Gyeongwon Line in South Korea. The station opened on 20 November 2012. This station is named after Baengmagoji, the site where the Battle of White Horse took place in 1952, during the Korean War.

History 

 4 December 2007: the restoration work of the Gyeongwon Line between Sintan-ri station and this station was commenced.
 20 November 2012: the station opened with 7-8 Tonggeun train services every day.
 14 April 2014: the station began to be served by 11 Tonggeun trains every day.
 1 August 2014: DMZ Train started to operate on the Gyeongwon Line with Baengmagoji station as the terminus.
 5 August 2015: the groundbreaking ceremony for the restoration work of the Gyeongwon Line from Baengmagoji to Woljeong-ri was held at the station.
 June 2016: the restoration work towards Woljeong-ri was halted.
 2 July 2018: track improvement work began on the Gyeongwon Line between Yeoncheon and Baengmagoji stations. Therefore, the Commuter Train and DMZ Train were cut back to Yeoncheon.
 1 April 2019: Services suspended due to the construction.

Gallery

Nearby places 
 Battle of White Horse memorial

External links
 

Railway stations in Gangwon Province, South Korea
Railway stations opened in 2012
Cheorwon County